Panjeh Ali Kharabehsi (also Romanized as Panjeh ‘Alī Kharābehsī; also known as Panj ‘Alī) is a village in Angut-e Sharqi Rural District, Anguti District, Germi County, Ardabil Province, Iran. At the 2006 census, its population was 190, in 41 families.

References 

Towns and villages in Germi County